Edgewater Park is a census-designated place (CDP) in Comanche County, Oklahoma, United States. It was first listed as a CDP prior to the 2020 census.

The CDP is in northern Comanche County, on high ground overlooking Lake Ellsworth from the west.

Lake Ellsworth is an impoundment on East Cache Creek, a south-flowing tributary of the Red River.

Demographics

References 

Census-designated places in Comanche County, Oklahoma
Census-designated places in Oklahoma